The 1961 USA–USSR Track and Field Dual Meet was an international track and field competition between the Soviet Union and the United States. The third in a series of meetings between the nations, it was held on July 15–16 in Lenin Stadium, Soviet Union, and finished with Soviet Union beating the United States 179 to 163. A total of 33 events were contested, 22 by men and 10 by women.

A total of five world records were broken at the competition – the most of any meeting in the series. Home athletes Valeriy Brumel, Tatyana Shchelkanova and Tamara Press set records in field events, while Ralph Boston and the American women's 4 × 100 meters relay team set world standards for the visitors.

World records

Results

Team score

Men

Women

References

Turrini, Joseph M. "It Was Communism Versus the Free World": The USA-USSR Dual Track Meet Series and the Development of Track and Field in the United States, 1958-1985. Journal of Sport History, Vol. 28, No. 3 (Fall 2001), pp. 427–471. Retrieved 2019-07-16.
The Cold War Track Series 1958-1965. Racing Past. Retrieved 2019-07-16.
Лёгкая атлетика. Справочник / Составитель Р. В. Орлов. — М.: «Физкультура и спорт», 1983. — С. 155–178, 385.
Матчи СССР — США // Лёгкая атлетика. Энциклопедия / Авторы-составители В. Б. Зеличёнок, В. Н. Спичков, В. Л. Штейнбах. — М.: «Человек», 2012. — Т. 1. — С. 623. — .

1961
International athletics competitions hosted by the Soviet Union
Sports competitions in Moscow
USA USSR Track and field
USA USSR Track and field
USA USSR Track and field
USA USSR Track and field
July 1961 sports events in Europe